Willy Winterstein (1895–1965) was an Austrian cinematographer.

Selected filmography

 The Marquis of Bolibar (1922)
 The Daughter of the Brigadier (1922)
 The Harbour Bride (1927)
 Almenrausch and Edelweiss (1928)
 The Harbour Baron (1928)
 The Call of the North (1929)
 The Man Without Love  (1929)
 Josef the Chaste (1930)
 Twice Married (1930)
 Pension Schöller (1930)
 The Spanish Fly (1931)
 The Unknown Guest (1931)
 The Emperor's Sweetheart (1931)
 A Crafty Youth (1931)
 The Magic Top Hat (1932)
 The Judas of Tyrol (1933)
 There Is Only One Love (1933)
 Miss Madame (1934)
 Hearts are Trumps (1934)
 At the Strasbourg (1934)
 Miss Liselott (1934)
 A Night on the Danube (1935)
 The Schimeck Family (1935)
 The Girl from the Marsh Croft (1935)
 She and the Three (1935)
 A Girl from the Chorus (1937)
 The Hound of the Baskervilles (1937) 
 Kitty and the World Conference (1939)
 Renate in the Quartet (1939)
 The Green Emperor (1939)
 Opera Ball (1939)
 Woman Without a Past (1939)
 Vienna Tales (1940)
 Roses in Tyrol (1940)
 I Entrust My Wife to You (1943)
 Sophienlund (1943)
 Circus Renz (1943)
 Die Fledermaus (1946)
 Second Hand Destiny (1949)
 The Last Night (1949)
 Shadows in the Night (1950)
 Gabriela (1950)
 Third from the Right (1950)
 Unknown Sender (1950)
 The Man in Search of Himself (1950)
 Abundance of Life (1950)
 Harbour Melody (1950)
 You Have to be Beautiful (1951)
 The Dubarry (1951)
 When the Heath Dreams at Night (1952)
 I Can't Marry Them All (1952)
 The Thief of Bagdad (1952)
 Holiday From Myself (1952)
 The Bird Seller (1953)
 Prosecutor Corda (1953)
 The Flower of Hawaii (1953)
 Money from the Air (1954)
 Three from Variety (1954)
 Love is Forever (1954)
 The Priest from Kirchfeld (1955)
 The Star of Rio (1955)
 When the Alpine Roses Bloom  (1955)
 Your Life Guards (1955)
 The Spanish Fly (1955)
 The Tour Guide of Lisbon (1956)
 The Stolen Trousers (1956)
 Three Birch Trees on the Heath (1956)
 Tired Theodore (1957)
 The Big Chance (1957)
 At the Green Cockatoo by Night (1957)
 Victor and Victoria (1957)
 Widower with Five Daughters (1957)
 The Blue Moth (1959)
 The Night Before the Premiere (1959)
 Pension Schöller (1960)
 The Bird Seller (1962)
 The Sweet Life of Count Bobby (1962)

References

Bibliography
 Wolfgang Jacobsen & Hans Helmut Prinzler. Käutner. Spiess, 1992.

External links

1895 births
1965 deaths
Austrian cinematographers
Austrian people of German Bohemian descent
People from Litoměřice